Crossroads of Passion (French: Carrefour des passions, Italian: Gli uomini sono nemici) is a 1948 French-Italian drama film directed by Ettore Giannini and Henri Calef and starring Viviane Romance, Clément Duhour and Valentina Cortese.

The film's sets were designed by the art director Guido Fiorini.

Cast
 Viviane Romance as Irène Dumesnil 
 Clément Duhour as Mario de Falla 
 Valentina Cortese as Maria Pilar 
 Gina Falckenberg as Hilde von Baldur 
 Fosco Giachetti as Toniani 
 Aroldo Tieri as Franciolini 
 Hans Hinrich as Fischer 
 Jean Wall as Jean Claes 
 Joop van Hulzen as Schmidt 
 Olinto Cristina as Dr. Slaceck 
 Sembt as Von Baldur
 Wanda Capodaglio
 Henri Charrett
 Andrea Checchi
 Riccardo Foti
 Marcello Giorda
 Folco Lulli
 Silvana Mangano
 Guido Notari
 Nico Pepe
 Franco Pesce

References

Bibliography
 Manuel Palacio & Jörg Türschmann. Transnational Cinema in Europe. LIT Verlag Münster, 2013.

External links

1948 films
French drama films
1940s Italian-language films
1948 drama films
Italian black-and-white films
Films directed by Ettore Giannini
Films directed by Henri Calef
French black-and-white films
Italian drama films
Films scored by Joseph Kosma
1940s Italian films
1940s French films